Kohneh Sara (also Romanized as Kohneh Sarā) is a village in Baladeh Kojur Rural District, in the Central District of Nowshahr County, Mazandaran Province, Iran. At the 2006 census, its population was 912, in 222 families.

References 

Populated places in Nowshahr County